was the fourteenth of twenty-four s, built for the Imperial Japanese Navy following World War I. When introduced into service, these ships were the most powerful destroyers in the world. They served as first-line destroyers through the 1930s, and remained formidable weapons systems well into the Pacific War.

History
Construction of the advanced Fubuki-class destroyers was authorized as part of the Imperial Japanese Navy's expansion program from fiscal 1923, intended to give Japan a qualitative edge with the world's most modern ships. The Fubuki class had performance that was a quantum leap over previous destroyer designs, so much so that they were designated . The large size, powerful engines, high speed, large radius of action and unprecedented armament gave these destroyers the firepower similar to many light cruisers in other navies. Yūgiri, built at the Maizuru Naval Arsenal was the fourth in an improved series, which incorporated a modified gun turret which could elevate her main battery of Type 3 127 mm 50 caliber naval guns to 75° as opposed to the original 40°, thus permitting the guns to be used as dual purpose guns against aircraft. Yūgiri was laid down on 1 April 1929, launched on 12 May 1930 and commissioned on 3 December 1930. Originally assigned hull designation “Destroyer No. 48”, she was named Yūgiri before her launch.

Operational history
In 1932, after the First Shanghai Incident, Yūgiri was assigned to patrols of the Yangtze River. In 1935, after the Fourth Fleet Incident, in which a large number of ships were damaged by a typhoon and Yūgiris bow was torn off, Yūgiri, along with her sister ships, were modified with stronger hulls and increased displacement. From 1937, Yūgiri covered landing of Japanese forces in Shanghai and Hangzhou in the Second Sino-Japanese War. From 1940, she was assigned to patrol and cover landings of Japanese forces in south China, and subsequently participated in the Invasion of French Indochina.

World War II history
At the time of the attack on Pearl Harbor, Yūgiri was assigned to Destroyer Division 20 of Desron 3 of the IJN 1st Fleet, and had deployed from Kure Naval District to the port of Samah on Hainan Island, escorting Japanese troopships for landing operations in the Battle of Malaya.

At the end of February, Yūgiri covered minesweeping operations around Singapore and Johore.

In March, Yūgiri joined "Operation T", the invasion of northern Sumatra, and the "Operation D", the invasion of the Andaman Islands. From 13–22 April Yūgiri returned via Singapore and Camranh Bay to Kure Naval Arsenal, for maintenance.

On 4–5 June, Yūgiri participated in the Battle of Midway as was part of the diversionary Aleutian Invasion force.　In July 1942, Yūgiri sailed from Amami-Ōshima to Mako Guard District, Singapore, Sabang and Mergui for a projected second Indian Ocean raid. The operation was cancelled due to the Guadalcanal campaign, and Yūgiri was ordered to Truk instead, arriving in late August.  After the Battle of the Eastern Solomons on 24 August, Yūgiri took on troops from transport ships while at sea, and sailed on to Guadalcanal. During this operation, she was struck by a direct hit near her bridge by a bomb from a United States Marine Corps SBD Dauntless dive bomber from Henderson Field, killing 32 crewmen, including the commander of Destroyer Division 20, Captain Yamada Yuji. After emergency repairs at Truk, Yūgiri returned to Kure Naval Arsenal in early October for repairs which took to the end of 1942.

From 25 January 1943, Yūgiri was reassigned to the IJN 8th Fleet. She returned to Rabaul at the end of April and was assigned to numerous "Tokyo Express" transport missions to various locations in the Solomon Islands in May. She was sent back to Japan for repairs at the end of July. Yūgiri returned to the Solomon Islands in mid November. On 24 November, Yūgiri was one of five destroyers on a troop transport/evacuation run to Buka. The Japanese submarine  rescued 278 survivors and  rescued 11 more; however, Yūgiri’s captain, Lieutenant Commander Shuichi Otsuji, went down with his ship.

On 15 December 1943, Yūgiri was removed from the navy list.

Notes

References

External links

Fubuki-class destroyers
Ships built by Maizuru Naval Arsenal
1930 ships
Second Sino-Japanese War naval ships of Japan
World War II destroyers of Japan
World War II shipwrecks in the Pacific Ocean
Maritime incidents in November 1943